These are the official results of the men's 10,000 metres event at the 1992 Summer Olympics in Barcelona, Spain. There were a total number of 56 participating athletes.  Khalid Skah from Morocco dueled with Richard Chelimo from Kenya during much of the race. It was a sprint finish over the last 150 meters, Skah pulled ahead and crossed the finish line 1.02 seconds in front of Chelimo.

Controversy
The Kenyans protested the finish, claiming that lapped Moroccan runner Hammou Boutayeb joined the lead pack of Chelimo and Skah with 3 laps to go in the race, apparently trying to help Skah. Boutayeb kept running in front of Chelimo and slowing down, causing him to miss his stride. Competition Rule 143.2 states that a lapped runner may not "assist" another runner. The race jury temporarily disqualified Skah for receiving assistance from Boutayeb. The Moroccans appealed to the Jury of Appeal of the IAAF. Since Rule 143.2 did not give any penalty for its violation, the Jury of Appeal reinstated Skah  With one lap to go, a meet referee actually pushed Boutayeb, trying to tell him to get out of the way.  Ultimately the race was decided by Skah out sprinting Chelimo head to head on the final straight.

Medalists

Records
These were the standing world and Olympic records (in minutes) prior to the 1992 Summer Olympics.

Final
Held on August 3, 1992

Heats

See also
 1990 Men's European Championships 10.000 metres (Split)
 1991 Men's World Championships 10.000 metres (Tokyo)
 1993 Men's World Championship 10.000 metres (Stuttgart)

References

External links
 Official Report
 Results

 
10,000 metres at the Olympics
Men's events at the 1992 Summer Olympics